Filbert Barinos Girado, Jr. (born April 14, 1979), better known by his stage name King, is a Filipino singer, musician, model and actor. He graduated with a degree of Bachelor of Science in Medical Technology from Far Eastern University. He is known for his hit songs such as "Maybe", "Bat 'di Mo Pagbigyan", and "Will You Wait for Me" from his albums Solo and The Reason I Exist under Star Music.

Biography
During his childhood, King was not interested in singing. However, he grew up in a music-filled environment. He is the second child of four by Filbert Girado, Sr., a businessman and former member of The Bayanihan Vocal Group, and Daulet Girado, a nurse who is also musically inclined. He is also the brother of Asia's Diamond Soul Siren Nina. His mom paid for him to learn the piano, but King told his younger sister Nina to go in his place. While he did show talent, King did not entertain the idea of being a singer. It was during his teen years when he discovered New Kids On The Block. He was fascinated by the high-pitched falsetto of Jordan Knight and wanted to be like him.

The love of music in the entertainment industry is too good to be resisted and King finally decided to try his luck in the music industry. King just respected the call to become a singer and joined his sister Nina as the frontman of the band MYMP. He also joined the boyband IdolZone 2 and formed his own group Domain when the band did not work out.

The last band he joined was Spunk. And when it fell apart, Star Records offered him an opportunity. Star Records at that time was planning to establish a local boy group, equivalent to international bands such as 'NSYNC and Backstreet Boys. King immediately grabbed the chance and auditioned. He was accepted but told to wait for they were lacking some more members.

Eventually, the plan of putting up a local boy band was set aside and he was chosen to be a part of the ”Solo” album project, a three-in-one album, performing with two other artists. The three was launched to stardom as solo performer through Solo. King’s first single “Maybe” hit the #1 spot in radio stations and established King as a recording artist. The album was awarded certified Gold status during King's Birthday celebration in ASAP.

In 2004, King launched his own album entitled The reason I exist at the Hardrock cafe together with the launch of his new music video "Ba't di mo pagbigyan".

He sang the Tagalog theme song Ikaw ang buhay Ko, an adaptation form the Taiwanese song Cun Zai for the 5566 Taiwanese Idol drama TV series Westside Story in ABS-CBN.

The Center for Pop Music Philippines awarded King as 2005 Singing Ambassador, a year after his sister Nina.

King represented the Philippines in the 2008 World Championships of Performing Arts and brought home medals in four categories in the male vocalist division.

He has held live concerts in other countries such as in the USA, Saipan, Dubai, Japan and Papua New Guinea.

Media appearances
Before King entered showbusiness, he had done television commercials such as Talk N' Txt, Nescafe and Lotus ballpen. In 2005, he did a Mexicorn TV commercial with actress Pauleen Luna.

He has become part of the Sunday variety show ASAP of ABS CBN after performing at the Happy 50TV concert with F4, Barbie Hsu and other Local artists.

He was chosen by MTV Philippines as their Rising star of the month of April 2004.

King appeared in an episode in Buttercup (TV series) of ABS CBN as a bar performer singing his song Muli mong mahalin.

He interpreted the song Huwag Ka Nang umiyak during the finals competition night of the 2004 Himig Handog Love songs which was recorded by True faith for the soundtrack.

King joined his fellow Star Music and ABS CBN artists in 2005 recording and doing a music video for the Philippine Tourism Authority (PTA) entitled "Pilipino sa Turismo’y Aktibo" featuring the Philippines' sights, destinations and cultural heritage.

King Appeared in a couple of his sister Nina's music video and also helped her conceptualize her latest 2011 album "Stay Alive".

Television
 "Chika Besh" (TV5)
 "Mars Pa More" (GMA 7)
 "Magandang Buhay" (ABS CBN 2)
 "All Out Sundays" (GMA 7)
 "Wowowin" (GMA 7)
 "Tunay Na Buhay" (GMA 7)
 "Ang Pinaka" (GMA News TV 27)
 "Tonight With Boy Abunda" (ABS CBN 2)
 "Thank You Kapuso: GMA @ 65 TV Special" (GMA 7)
 "Sunday PinaSaya" (GMA 7)
 "The Singing Bee Philippines" (ABS CBN 2)
 "Protege" (GMA 7)
 "OMJ With Ogie & Jobert" (TeleRadyo Channel)
 "Todo Todd Walang Preno" (TeleRadyo Channel)
 "The Voice Of The Philippines" (ABS CBN 2)
 "ASOP: A Song Of Praise Talent Show" (UNTV 37)
 "The Ryzza Mae Show" (GMA 7)
 "Celebrity Samurai" (TV5)
 "Artista Academy" (TV5)
 "Batibot Sa 5" (TV5)
 "Lokomoko U" (TV5)
 "GMA @ 60: The Heart Of Television TV Special" (GMA 7)
 "Sunday All Stars" (GMA 7)
 "Party Pilipinas" (GMA 7)
 "It's Showtime" (ABS CBN 2)
 "Master Showman Presents Walang Tulugan (GMA 7)
 "Wowowillie" (TV5)
 "Pinoy Dream Academy" (ABS CBN 2)
 Myx Mo! TV Special (MYX Channel)
 Chowtime (IBC 13)
 Heatthrobs 911 - MTB (ABS CBN 2)
 StarQuest - MTB (ABS CBN 2)
 Happy50TV Concert (ABS CBN 2)
 Victim (ABS CBN 2)
 ASAP' Natin To" (ABS CBN 2)
 ABS CBN 2004 Christmas special (ABS CBN 2)
 Buttercup (ABS CBN 2)
 Unang Hirit (GMA 7)
 Umagang Kay Ganda (ABS CBN 2)
 All Star K! The 1Million Videoke challenge (GMA 7)
 Star in a Million (ABS CBN 2)
 MRS (ABS CBN 2)
 2006 Binibining Pilipinas Talent night (GMA 7)
 Tapatan (UNTV 25)
 "Magandang Tanghali Bayan" (ABS CBN 2)
 "Philippine Idol" (TV5)
 Sing Galing (TV5)
 Sing A Gong (TV5)
 Mornings at ANC (ANC)
 Kris & Korina (ABS CBN 2)
 At Home Ako dito (ABS CBN 2)
 SIS (GMA 7)
 Eat Bulaga (GMA 7)
 Wowowee (ABS CBN 2)
 Pop Myx (Studio 23 "now ABS CBN Sports & Action Channel)
 Mellow Myx (Studio 23 "now ABS CBN Sports & Action Channel)
 Myx Live! (Studio 23 "now ABS CBN Sports & Action Channel)
 MTV Philippines (MTV)
 Homeboy (ABS CBN 2)
 ASOP TV (UNTV)

Discography

Studio albums
2003: Solo/Josh, Divo, King (King, Divo Bayer, Josh Santana) - received gold record award in 2004
2004: The Reason I Exist

Other albums
2003: The  Brightest Stars of Christmas Star Music
2004: My first Romance (Movie Soundtrack) Star Music
2004: Weekend Love (Movie Soundtrack) Star Music
2005: Krystala (Original Soundtrack) Star Music
2011: Baby & Just the way You are Non-stop Christmas Medley with Beatphonics Warner Music Philippines

Awards
 1997: Grand champion Heartthrobs 911 sing and lookalike contest (Sang Linggo NAPO Sila,ABS CBN)
 2005: Gold record award for Solo Album (Star Music)
 2005: Gold record award for King The reason I exist (Star Music)
 2005: Center for Pop Music Philippines Ambassador
 2006: Best Male Performer (National Consumers Quality Awards)
 2008: Gold Medal (Rock Category) World Championships of the Performing Arts
 2008: Silver Medal (Contemporary Category) World Championships of the Performing Arts
 2008: Silver Medal (Broadway Category) World Championships of the Performing Arts
 2008: Bronze Medal (Gospel Category) World Championships of the Performing Arts

Nominations
2004: Best Male performer (Maybe), The Awit Awards
2004: Best New Male performer (Maybe), The Awit Awards
2005: Best Male performer for Hotels, bars and Lounges, The Aliw Awards
2006: Best Male performer for Hotels, bars and Lounges, The Aliw Awards

References

1979 births
Living people
Filipino male pop singers
21st-century Filipino male singers
Filipino dance musicians
Filipino television personalities
Filipino male television actors
Filipino male models
English-language singers from the Philippines
Star Magic
Rhythm and blues singers
Tagalog-language singers
People from Pasay
Singers from Metro Manila
Male actors from Metro Manila
Far Eastern University alumni